In Fijian mythology, Dakuwaqa (Dakuwanga) is a shark-god. He was greatly respected by fishermen because he protected them from any danger at sea and sometimes protected them from evil denizens of the sea.

He was once going inland to conquer Kadavu Island through the river when another goddess challenged him in the form of an octopus. After a great battle, the octopus won by pulling out his teeth with her 8 arms which enabled her to hold off the massive attack of Dakuwaqa, forcing Dakuwaqa to promise to never attack Kadavu again. That is how Dakuwaqa became the god and protector of Kadavu. Dakuwaqa can also change shape into anything, but his real form is that of a muscular Fijian man with the upper torso of a shark.

In the book Pacific Irishman, the Anglican priest Charles William Whonsbon-Aston records in Chapter 1, Creation:

In popular culture 
American writer Jeff VanderMeer wrote a story about Dakuwaqa that can be found in his book, The Third Bear.

Dakuwaqa is featured and recreated in the third episode of the TV miniseries Beast Legends.

Dakuwaqa is the father of the supervillain King Shark in the DC Universe.

Dakuwanga is an Atlantean Bio-weapon in the Earth Prime setting of the Mutants & Masterminds roleplaying game.

Dakuwanga is the official pet in the "Quidditch World Cup Argentina 2014" in the Harry Potter universe.

See also 
Avatea
Kamohoalii
Ukupanipo

References

External links

Fijian deities
Fish gods
Sea and river gods
Shapeshifting
Animal gods